Bryan Park is a  community park in Downsville, LA. It features a  pond, surrounded by a walking trail, and around 40 species of trees.

Located within the rural village of Downsville, Bryan Park can be entered either by road or a walking path from the graveled apron on LA 151. Cresting the rise, visitors can leave their vehicles at the parking areas and take a walk under the oaks. An easy walking trail through bottomland hardwoods and mixed pine forest around the  pond leads to areas where nesting species as black-throated green or black and white warblers, northern parulas, and red-shouldered and Cooper's hawks may be viewed. Wading birds such as great egret, great blue heron, and green heron also frequent the pond and the cattail perimeter hosts red-winged blackbirds. In the warmer months, honeysuckle attracts ruby-throated hummingbirds. Wetland migrants include marsh wren and common yellowthroat in the fall and spring. In the late winter until spring, black vultures court and cruise. Generally, the park boundaries are alive with numerous species of birds, including woodpeckers, eastern bluebirds, various sparrows, vireos, Indigo buntings, eastern meadowlarks, bobwhites, mourning dove, northern cardinals, blue jays and owls.

History
Bryan Park was originally part of the Bryan Sausage company.  In April 2007, Bill and Sue Bryan donated the land to the Village of Downsville, with the stipulation that it be used as a public community park.

External links
 Map of Bryan Park

References
 Mississippi River Birding Trail

Parks in Louisiana
Protected areas of Union Parish, Louisiana